Ermelo's Orange is a type of fruit from Miranda do Douro, Alto Trás-os-Montes, Norte Region  in Portugal. It is listed on the Ark of Taste.

It takes its name from 'Ermelo', a parish in Arcos de Valdevez Municipality, Portugal. It was introduced to the region by 
Cistercian monks in the 12th century. They are very sweet, seedless and juicy with a thin peel, and are generally grown organically. They are harvested in April.

References

Orange cultivars